Mark Sainsbury may refer to:

Mark Sainsbury (philosopher) (born 1943), British philosopher
Mark Sainsbury (broadcaster) (born 1956), New Zealand current affairs presenter